Luis Ricardo Rodríguez Jérez (born 27 September 1982) is a Guatemalan professional football defender who currently plays for Deportivo Mictlán in the Liga Nacional de Guatemala.

Club career
Rodríguez was loaned to Club Xelajú MC by local giants Comunicaciones but did not want to leave Xelaju in 2007 while still being under contract at the Cremas since he felt he was not being valued highly by them. In January 2010, he rejoined Xelaju from CD Suchitepéquez.

International career
Rodríguez made his debut for Guatemala in a May 2008 friendly match against El Salvador after being called up for the first time for the April 2008 game against Haiti. He had earned 11 caps at the start of February 2010, including 6 qualifying matches for the 2010 FIFA World Cup.

References

External links
 

1982 births
Living people
People from Suchitepéquez Department
Guatemalan footballers
Guatemala international footballers
Comunicaciones F.C. players
Xelajú MC players
C.D. Suchitepéquez players
Association football defenders